The Chief of the Joint General Staff of the Armed Forces ( - EMCFA) is the  professional head of the Brazilian Armed Forces, who is responsible for the centralizes the coordination and control of the three branches: Army, Navy and Air Force. The position was created through the Complementary Law No. 136 of 25 August 2010, and is guided by Ordinance No. 1429.

Commander of Joint General Staff of the Armed Forces
The head of the EMCFA is nominated by the defense minister and appointed by the President, as the commanders of the forces and will have the same hierarchical level of these and ascendancy over all other military of any of the Force, except over the commanders themselves. The position will be occupied by a general officer's last stand (four stars) in both the active and the reserve and, if active, will automatically for the booking of the appointment, as it is with the commanders of each Forces.

List of chiefs

References

Ministry of Defence (Brazil)
Brazil